Josip Pečarić (born 2 September 1948) is a Croatian mathematician.  He is a professor of mathematics in the Faculty of Textile Technology at the University of Zagreb, Croatia, and is a full member of the Croatian Academy of Sciences and Arts.  He has written and co-authored over 1,200 mathematical publications. He has also published a number of works on history and politics that have been described as comprising historical negationism or Holocaust denial.

Education
Pečarić  was born in Kotor, Montenegro (at the time part of Yugoslavia) on 2 September 1948, where he remained to attend elementary and high school.  He studied at the University of Belgrade's Faculty of Electrical Engineering for his undergraduate and master's degrees, which he completed respectively in 1972 and 1975.  The supervisor of his master's degree, mathematics professor, Dobrilo Tošić, inspired him to switch fields to mathematics.

Pečarić remained at the University of Belgrade, working on his PhD in mathematics from 1975 to 1982. He received it under the supervision of Petar Vasić.  His dissertation was on Jensen's and related inequalities.  He began working at the University of Zagreb in 1987.

Mathematics career
Pečarić is known for his work in the theory of inequalities.  He has founded several journals, all published by Element in Zagreb: he is currently Editor-in-Chief at Mathematical Inequalities and Applications and at the Journal of Mathematical Inequalities, and also founded Operators and Matrices.

Pečarić has written and co-authored over 1,200 articles on mathematics in journals, books, and conference proceedings.  He has also coauthored over 20 mathematical books, including 6 that are written in English.

Political views and historical negationism

In addition to his mathematical work, Pečarić has published more than 20 books and 40 articles on history and politics. This work is from a far-right point of view, and has been criticized as comprising historical negationism or Holocaust denial.

For example, Pečarić has advocated for the return of the World War II-era fascist salute Za dom spremni. This salute has been called the Croatian equivalent of the German Sieg Heil.  His 2017 book General Praljak reinvents the war criminal Slobodan Praljak as a humanist and war hero.  His books Serbian Myths about Jasenovac and The Jasenovac Lie Revealed, the latter coauthored with Stjepan Razum, argued that the Jasenovac concentration camp was a labor camp with much lower casualties than the commonly accepted figure, and that the bulk of its victims were Croats killed by Yugoslav communist authorities after the war.  This last prompted the Simon Wiesenthal Centre to advocate the Croatian government to ban publications denying the war crimes of the Ustaša.

Honors and awards
Pečarić has received a number of honors and awards.  He was awarded the Croatian National Science Award in 1996, and received the Order of Danica Hrvatska in 1999.  Pečarić was appointed to full membership of the Croatian Academy of Sciences and Arts in 2000.  In 2008, a conference was held in honor of his 60th birthday and an issue (volume 2 no. 2) of the Banach Journal of Mathematical Analysis was dedicated to him.  Another conference was held in 2014 in Pečarić's honor on the occasion of the publication of his 1000th mathematical paper.

Selected Bibliography

Textbooks 
Recent Advances in Geometric Inequalities, co-authored with Dragoslav Mitrinović and Veno Volenec. Dordecht : Springer Science & Business Media (1989). 
 Inequalities Involving Functions and Their Integrals and Derivatives, co-authored with Dragoslav Mitrinović and A.M. Fink. Dordecht : Springer; Kluwer Academic Publishers (1991). 
Convex Functions, Partial Orderings, and Statistical Applications, co-authored with Frank Proschan and Y.L. Tong. Boston : Academic Press (1992). 
Classical and New Inequalities in Analysis, co-authored with Dragoslav Mitrinović and A.M. Fink. Dordecht : Springer Science & Business Media (1993). 
Mond-Pečarić Method in Operator Inequalities, co-authored with Takayuki Furuta, Jadranka Mićić Hot and Yuki Seo. Zagreb : Element (2005). 
Multiplicative Inequalities of Carlson Type and Interpolation, co-authored with Leo Larsson, Lech Maligranda and Lars-Erik Persson.  World Scientific Publishing Co. (2006).

Journal articles 
Inequalities for Differentiable Mappings with Application to Special Means and Quadrature Formulæ, with Charles E. M. Pearce in Applied Mathematics Letters (2000). 
Hadamard-type Inequalities for S-convex Functions, with Ugur S Kirmaci, Milica Klaričić Bakula and Mehmet Emin Özdemir in Applied Mathematics and Computation (2007). 
New Means of Cauchy's Type, with Matloob Anwar in Journal of Inequalities and Applications (2008).

Non-fiction books 
Srpski mit o Jasenovcu: Skrivanje istine o beogradskim konc-logorima. Zagreb : Croatian information centre (1998).
Srpski mit o Jasenovcu II: O Bulajićevoj ideologijigenocida hrvatskih autora. Zagreb : Element (2000).
Serbian myth about Jasenovac. Zagreb : Stih (2001). 
Književnik Mile Budak sada i ovdje [Writer Mile Budak here and now]. Zagreb : Vlastita naklada (2005).  
General Praljak, co-authored with Miroslav Međimorec. Zagreb : Vlastita naklada (2017). 
Razotkrivena jasenovačka laž [The Jasenovac Lie Revealed], co-authored with Stjepan Razum. Zagreb : Društvo za istraživanje trostrukog logora Jasenovac (2018).

References

Sources 
 

Living people
1948 births
Croats of Montenegro
Croatian mathematicians
Croatian Holocaust deniers
Deniers of the genocide of Serbs in the Independent State of Croatia
Members of the Croatian Academy of Sciences and Arts
People from Kotor
University of Belgrade School of Electrical Engineering alumni
Academic staff of the University of Zagreb